Pips, Chips & Videoclips are a Croatian rock band from the capital Zagreb. They formed in the early 1990s and have released seven studio albums and a number of singles.

The band first came to prominence in 1992 when they recorded Dinamo ja volim, a rock song which instantly became an unofficial anthem of GNK Dinamo Zagreb football club supporters Bad Blue Boys. On December 6th, 2014, they sold out sporting hall Dom Sportova in Zagreb and played one of the biggest concert of their career.

Formation and Shimpoo Pimpoo (1992-1995) 
In 1992, Dubravko Ivaniš and Alen Kraljić met and formed the band. Ivaniš and Kraljić then recruited Mario Borščak (bass) and Igor Paradiš (drums) in Grill Zapruđe, a diner located in Zapruđe neighbourhood in Zagreb. The name of the band is a word play on the name of the movie Sex, Lies and Videotape. Their first major hit, "Dinamo ja volim" was originally intended to be a disco tune, but Kraljić insisted on doing something more heavier, considering Bad Blue Boys were mostly listening to punk music. The song was inspired from The Adicts' version of You'll Never Walk Alone. The song starts off with Ivaniš singing the poem Popevke sam slagal, originally written by Dragutin Domjanić. The song became an instant hit and is now considered to be the unofficial anthem of GNK Dinamo Zagreb. At the time, the club was called HAŠK Građanski, much to the dismay of the fans.

In December 1993, the band released their first studio album, Shimpoo Pimpoo, which included one of their first songs, "Krumpira" ("Potatoes"). Some of the band's other early songs, like "Gume na kotačima" and "Prvi joint u ustima", became a staple in band's further live performances. In 1994, the band was supporting Mišo Kovač for a charity concert held in Stadion Poljud. During 1994, songs from Shimpoo Pimpoo were included in Borivoj Radaković's play Dobro došli u plavi pakao ("Welcome to the blue hell") and in the following year, the band composed soundtrack for the play Mafija!.

Dernjava (1995-1997) 
Sometime before recording their second studio album, guitarist Igor Ratković and guitarist Davor Viduka joined the band. In December 1995, the bank released their second studio album, Dernjava. The album was a commercial success. Praised for the lyrics and guitar work, the album received the Porin for the best alternative rock album of 1996. Songs like "Poštar lakog sna" and "Malena" have become fan favourites. In 1996, the band shot a music video for "Poštar lakog sna". Many rock celebrities, such as Kojoti, Goran Bare, and Davor Gobac of Psihomodo Pop appeared in the video. The video was shot in Crna Kuća, a mansion located in Zagreb. The band signed a contract with Duyvis and became their promoter in Croatia. From 1996 to 1999, Duyvis advertisements can be seen in many of band's music videos ("Nogomet", "Poštar lakog sna", "Plači").

Discography

Albums
 Shimpoo Pimpoo (1993, re-released in 1996)
 Dernjava (1995)
 Fred Astaire (1997)
 Bog (1999)
 Drveće i rijeke ("Trees and rivers") (2003)
 Dokument (2005, live album)
 Pjesme za gladijatore ("Songs for the gladiators") (2007)
 2x2 (2011, live DVD)
 Walt (2013)

Singles
 Dinamo ja volim (1993)
 Dan, mrak (1999)
 Narko (2000)
 Motorcycle Boy (2000)
 Ultraoptimizam (2000)
 Porculan (2003)
 Narko (2005)
 Teroristi plaču (2007)

Compilations
 Diskografija (2010)

References

External links
Official website 
 (biography)

Croatian rock music groups
Musical groups established in 1992
Musicians from Zagreb